Czechoslovakia submitted films for the Academy Award for Best International Feature Film between 1964 and 1991 before splitting into the independent Czech and Slovakia republics in 1993. The award is handed out annually by the United States Academy of Motion Picture Arts and Sciences to a feature-length motion picture produced outside the United States that contains primarily non-English dialogue.

Czechoslovak films received six Oscar nominations for the Academy Award for Best Foreign Language Film, two of which won the Oscar, namely the Slovak-language The Shop on Main Street and the Czech-language Closely Watched Trains, both of which are black comedies set during World War II. Director Miloš Forman had two of his films selected to represent Czechoslovakia in the 1960s, and both were nominated. Forman eventually won two Oscars for Best Director after emigrating to the United States.

After the breakup of Czechoslovakia, the Czech Republic and Slovak Republic both began submitting films to the competition regularly. Since then, the Czech Republic has gotten three more Oscar nominations, including one win for Jan Svěrák's Kolya.

Submissions
The Academy of Motion Picture Arts and Sciences has invited the film industries of various countries to submit their best film for the Academy Award for Best Foreign Language Film since 1956. The Foreign Language Film Award Committee oversees the process and reviews all the submitted films. Following this, they vote via secret ballot to determine the five nominees for the award. Below is a list of the films that have been submitted by Czechoslovakia for review by the Academy for the award by the year of the submission and the respective Academy Award ceremony.

Almost all submissions were primarily in Czech, although their 1982 and 1984 submissions were mostly in Slovak.

See also
List of Academy Award winners and nominees for Best Foreign Language Film
List of Academy Award-winning foreign language films
List of Czech submissions for the Academy Award for Best International Feature Film
List of Slovak submissions for the Academy Award for Best International Feature Film
Cinema of the Czechoslovakia

Notes

References

External links
The Official Academy Awards Database
The Motion Picture Credits Database
IMDb Academy Awards Page

Czechoslovakia
 
Czechoslovakia-related lists
Czechoslovakia–United States relations